"Escape in Time" is the third episode of the fifth series of the 1960s cult British spy-fi television series The Avengers, starring Patrick Macnee and Diana Rigg, and guest starring Peter Bowles, Geoffrey Bayldon, Judy Parfitt, and Imogen Hassall. It was first broadcast in the Southern region of the ITV network on Monday 23 January 1967. ABC Weekend Television, who commissioned the show for ITV, broadcast it in its own regions five days later on Saturday 28 January. The episode was directed by John Krish, and written by Philip Levene.

Plot
Wanted criminals such as Carl Blechner and President Bibigyn vanish without a trace. When one Ministry agent Clyde Paxton stumbles upon a time machine looking like a slot, he is shot down with a centuries old bullet. This prompts John steed and Emma Peel to investigate what is happening with these criminals and find their supposed escape route through the Tudor past.

Cast
Patrick Macnee as John Steed
Diana Rigg as Emma Peel
Peter Bowles as Thyssen
Geoffrey Bayldon as Clapham
Judy Parfitt as Vesta
Imogen Hassall as Anjali
Edward Caddick as Sweeney
Nicholas Smith as Parker
Roger Booth as Tubby Vincent
Richard Montez as Josino
Clifford Earl as Paxton
Rocky Taylor as Mitchell

References

External links

Episode overview on The Avengers Forever! website

The Avengers (season 5) episodes